Allen Irving Questrom (born April 13, 1941 in Newton, Massachusetts), is a retired retailing executive. He served as CEO of Federated Department Stores, Neiman Marcus, Barneys New York, and J. C. Penney. He is also a Senior Advisor of Lee Equity Partners, LLC.

Allen graduated from Boston University in 1964.

The following year, he joined Abraham & Straus as an executive trainee, eventually rising to merchandising manager. After eight years at A, & S., Allen joined Bullock's in 1973, spending five years there as vice president and general merchandise manager and later as executive vice president.

In 1978, Allen became president of Rich's.

In February 1980, Questrom was named chairman and chief executive officer of Rich's, succeeding Joel Goldberg.

Questrom resigned from Rich's for personal reasons in January 1984, and was succeeded as chairman and chief executive by president James M. Zimmerman. After spending the next several months traveling the world, Questrom was named chairman and chief executive officer of Bullock's in August 1984, succeeding Franklin Simon.

See also 
 Questrom School of Business

References 

American chief executives
1941 births
People from Newton, Massachusetts
Boston University alumni
Living people